is Japanese rugby union prop.

Biography
After graduating from Higashiuji High School and from Kyoto Sangyo University, in 1989, Takura joined Mitsubishi Sagamihara DynaBoars team. In that same year, he caught the eye of Hiroaki Shukuzawa who just became coach of the Japan national team, stating that "Takura is strong and stable in the scrum ". Takura debuted on 29 May 1989, in Tokyo against Scotland XV, where Japan won 28-24. Since then, in the "Shukuzawa Japan" era, he reigned as a firm right prop, winning a total of 16 caps. He also took part at the 1991 and 1995 Rugby World Cups.

References
 Kyosan University & TL replacement game result - Koichi Murakami Rugby love diary February 12, 2011

Specific

External links

1966 births
Living people
Japanese rugby union players
Rugby union props
Sportspeople from Kyoto
Japan international rugby union players
Mitsubishi Sagamihara DynaBoars players
Kyoto Sangyo University alumni